Coccodiella is a genus of fungi in the family Phyllachoraceae.

Species
As accepted by Species Fungorum;

 Coccodiella advena 
 Coccodiella andicola 
 Coccodiella arundinariae 
 Coccodiella banksiae 
 Coccodiella bullosa 
 Coccodiella calatheae 
 Coccodiella capparis 
 Coccodiella chamaedoreae 
 Coccodiella depressa 
 Coccodiella leandrae 
 Coccodiella machaerii 
 Coccodiella melastomatum 
 Coccodiella miconiae 
 Coccodiella miconiicola 
 Coccodiella minuta 
 Coccodiella myrtacearum 
 Coccodiella neurophila 
 Coccodiella polymorpha 
 Coccodiella puttemansii 
 Coccodiella toledoi 
 Coccodiella translucens 

Former species;
 C. bactridis  = Coccostromopsis diplothemii
 C. munkii  = Uleodothis munkii, Venturiaceae family
 C. nervisequens  = Coccostromopsis diplothemii
 C. nuda  = Coccostroma nudum
 C. peribebuyensis  = Coccostroma peribebuyense
 C. petrakii  = Oxodeora petrakii
 C. symploci  = Camarotella symploci

References

External links
Index Fungorum

Sordariomycetes genera
Phyllachorales